Embu may refer to:

Places
 in Brazil
 Embu das Artes
 Embu-Guaçu

 in Kenya
 Embu, Kenya
 Embu County

Other
Embu people of Kenya
Embu language, the Bantu language spoken by them